Ellen Helen Nikolaysen (born 10 December 1951) is a Norwegian singer/actress. She participated in the Eurovision Song Contest in 1973 as part of the Bendik Singers group with the song It's Just A Game and Eurovision this time as a solo artist in 1975 with Touch My Life With Summer. She won the Best Performance Award at the World Popular Song Festival in Tokyo in 1974 with the entry "You Made Me Feel I Could Fly". In the early 1990s she began a new career as actor in musicals on Norwegian theatre stages.

Discography

Albums
1972; Stans! Jeg vil gi deg en sang
1973: Freckles
1976: Kom
1978: Jul med Hans Petter og Ellen with Hans Petter Hansen
1983: Songar utan ord with Sigmund Groven
1987: Julekvad

Singles
 1971 "Livet er som et orkester" ("We're All Playing in the Same Band") / Kom, kom, kom (Pomme, pomme, pomme) (Philips 6084 008)
 1973 "Sangen han sang var min egen" ("Killing Me Softly With His Song")   / Når du ler
 1974 "Kunne du lese tanker"
 1974 "You Made Me Feel I Could Fly" / "Who Put the Lights Out" (Philips 6084 043)
 1975 "Du gjorde verden så lys" / "Hvis du tror meg (si det nå)" (Philips 6084 045)
 1975 "Touch My Life With Summer" / "You Made Me Feel I Could Fly" (Philips 6084 046)
 1975 "Wer liebt kommt wieder" / "Aber du" (Philips 6003 419)
 1977 "Sommerzeit" / "Du bist nicht mehr, was du mal warst" Boy (CBS 5262)

References

1951 births
Living people
Eurovision Song Contest entrants for Norway
Eurovision Song Contest entrants of 1973
Eurovision Song Contest entrants of 1975
Melodi Grand Prix contestants
Norwegian musical theatre actresses
Norwegian women singers
Melodi Grand Prix winners
Winners of Yamaha Music Festival
English-language singers from Norway
Philips Records artists